This is a list of designs for crewed lunar landers, spacecraft intended to land on  the Moon. A key aspect is achieving a soft landing, and for an ascent stage to successfully escape the Moon's gravity. Another aspect is how many stages the design has to undergo to achieve its objective, and the number of passengers and amount of payload it can carry.

See also
Human spaceflight

References

External links
Lunar lander conceptual design

Crewed spacecraft
Landers (spacecraft)